Expedia.com is an online travel agency owned by Expedia Group, based in Seattle. The website and mobile app can be used to book airline tickets, hotel reservations, car rentals, cruise ships, and vacation packages. Expedia.com was launched on October 22, 1996 by Microsoft. It began accepting bitcoins for payment in 2014.

History

Sponsorships
Starting the 2018-21 cycle, Expedia Group became the first-ever global sponsor of the UEFA Champions League and the UEFA Super Cup as Expedia extends to another season until 2024 and Hotels.com will end the sponsorship after 2021-22 season. Starting the pandemic-hit 2020-21 season, Expedia struck the deal with the 2020 English champions, Liverpool F.C. as a global sponsor of the website in 3 seasons until 2023.

Criticism and legal issues

Delays in refunds of flights cancelled due to COVID-19
In 2020, during the COVID-19 pandemic, customers complained regarding the process to get refunds for cancelled flights. Customers complained of excessively long call times and being unable to get through to a representative. This led to many lawsuits.

Involvement in Israeli settlements

On February 12, 2020, Expedia Group was included on a list of companies operating in West Bank settlements involved in activities that "raised particular human rights concerns" published by the United Nations Human Rights Council. The company was categorized under "the provision of services and utilities supporting the maintenance and existence of settlements". The international community considers Israeli settlements built on land occupied by Israel to be in violation of international law.

False advertising and trademark violation
In August 2016, Buckeye Tree Lodge and Sequoia Village Inn, LLC filed a class-action lawsuit in California accusing the company and its partners of violating trademark rights of numerous independent hotel and motel establishments by running advertising implying that consumers could book reservations for those hotels on Expedia even though Expedia had no relationship with those hotels, in violation of the Lanham Act, and also falsely noting that hotels with which the company had no relationship were "sold out". In April 2021, the lawsuit was settled and the company promised not to engage in false advertising.

References

Further reading

External links 
 

Expedia Group
American companies established in 1996
Hospitality companies established in 1996
Internet properties established in 1996
Travel ticket search engines
American travel websites
Universal Windows Platform apps